Lightnin' is a 1930 American pre-Code comedy film directed by Henry King and written by S. N. Behrman and Sonya Levien. The film stars Will Rogers, Louise Dresser, Joel McCrea, Helen Cohan, Jason Robards Sr. and Luke Cosgrave. The film was released on December 7, 1930, by Fox Film Corporation. It is a remake of the 1925 silent film, which was directed by John Ford, which itself was based on the 1918 play.

Plot
Lightnin' has a young man come to his hotel to find his wife who is seeking a divorce. He talks to the two who obviously are in love, but they get in a tiff and the young man says he is leaving. Lightnin' whispers to wife to call him back, and then he has a sit down heart to heart talk and the couple leave with their marriage saved.

Cast
    
Will Rogers as Lightnin' Bill Jones
Louise Dresser as Mrs. Mary Jones
Joel McCrea as John Marvin
Helen Cohan as Milly Jones
Jason Robards Sr. as Raymond Thomas
Luke Cosgrave as Zeb
J. M. Kerrigan as Judge Lemuel Townsend
Ruth Warren as Mrs. Margaret Davis
Sharon Lynn as Mrs. Lower 
Joyce Compton as Betty
Rex Bell as Larry 
Goodee Montgomery as Mrs. Brooks 
Phil Tead as Monte Winslow
Walter Percival as Everett Hammond
Charlotte Walker as Mrs. Thatcher

References

External links

1930 films
1930s English-language films
Fox Film films
American comedy films
1930 comedy films
Films directed by Henry King
American black-and-white films
1930s American films